New Point may refer to the following places in the United States:

 New Point, Indiana
 New Point, Missouri
 New Point, Virginia